Megumi Itō may refer to:
 Megumi Itō (synchronized swimmer)
 Megumi Ito (footballer)